Empath is an American noise punk band from Philadelphia. The current lineup is Catherine Elicson (guitar/vocals), Jem Shanahan (synthesiser), Randall Coon (synthesiser), and Garrett Koloski (drums). They have released one album and several EPs, and are currently signed to Fat Possum Records.

History
Empath was formed by Catherine Elicson, Jem Shanahan and Garrett Koloski in 2015 whilst the three were roommates in Philadelphia. Elicson had recently moved from Columbus, Ohio, where she had been in the bands Goners and Katherine. Koloski was then the drummer in Syracuse, New York band Perfect Pussy. The trio recorded Crystal Reality Volumes 1 & 2.

They began recording what would become Liberating Guilt and Fear in 2016 with Koloski’s former bandmate, Shaun Sutkus. After Coon joined in 2017, he recorded his parts that autumn. It was mastered by Greg Saunier of Deerhoof and eventually released by Get Better Records in 2018. That same year they released a 7" titled Environments, named in tribute to Irv Teibel’s 1970s album series of the same name.

In 2018 the band released their debut LP Active Listening: Night on Earth, once again through Get Better Records. The positive reception led to their signing to Fat Possum Records, who immediately reissued the record - along with a vinyl pressing of Liberating Guilt and Fear for the first time.

In late 2021 Empath announced their second album, entitled Visitor, would be released on 11th February 2022.

Discography

Albums
Active Listening: Night on Earth – Get Better Records, 12" LP, MP3 (2019) / Fat Possum Records, 12" LP, MP3 (2019)
Visitor – Fat Possum Records, 12" LP, MP3 (2022)

Extended plays
Crystal Reality Vol. 1 – Self released, Cassette, MP3 (2016)
Crystal Reality Vol. 2 – Self released, Cassette, MP3 (2016)
Liberating Guilt and Fear – Get Better Records, Cassette, MP3 (2018)
Environments – Get Better Records, 7" single, MP3 (2018)

References

American punk rock groups
Punk rock groups from Pennsylvania
Musical groups from Philadelphia
Musical groups established in 2015
2015 establishments in Pennsylvania